Ad-Dustour (meaning The Constitution) is an Arabic daily newspaper published in Jordan. Its headquarters is in Amman, Jordan.

History and profile
The first issue of Ad-Dustour (in Arabic الدستور) was published on 28 March 1967 as a result of a merger of two publications: Filastin (in Arabic فلسطين) and Al Manar (in Arabic المنار) published in the West Bank and that had ceased publication in 1967 because of the Six-Day War.

The daily was a private company until 1986 when the Jordanian government bought a share of it. The daily has nearly 600 staff.

From 1991 to 1995 Musa Keilani served as the editor-in-chief of the paper. Its editor was Nabil Sharif until February 2009. Its current editor-in-chief is Mustafa Riyalat.

In 1998, the daily started its website, the first in the Arab world to do so.

The estimated circulation of Ad-Dustour was 40,000 whereas it was 90,000 copies in 2003.

An Arabic website, Industry Arabic, named Ad Dustour as the most influential Arabic newspaper in 2020.

Contents
The daily contains four or five sections:

First Section: for headline and domestic news.
Second Section: for international news, business and economy.
Addustour Alriyadi: for international and domestic sport news.
Doroob: for miscellaneous news related to health and living styles.
The Cultural Section: This section appears every Friday and contains domestic, regional, and international cultural events.
Al-Shabab: This section is published every Wednesday, and daily during major sport competitions such as FIFA World Cup. It covers weekly domestic, and international youth events.

See also
 List of newspapers in Jordan

References

External links 
 

1967 establishments in Jordan
Newspapers established in 1967
Newspapers published in Jordan
Arabic-language newspapers
Mass media in Amman